The Ruaha chat (Myrmecocichla collaris) is a species of bird in the family Muscicapidae. It is found in western Tanzania, eastern Rwanda, Burundi, and northern Zambia. Its natural habitats are dry savanna, subtropical or tropical dry lowland grassland, and subtropical or tropical high-altitude grassland.

The Ruaha chat was formerly considered a subspecies of Arnot's chat (Myrmecocichla arnotti). Clements has lumped the bird into the Arnot's chat.

References

Ruaha chat
Birds of East Africa
Ruaha chat